Luis Enrique Romero Heredia (born April 10, 1991, in Acapulco, Guerrero) was a Mexican professional footballer who last played for Atlético Zacatepec. He retired after the 2016–2017 season.

References

External links

Living people
1991 births
Mexican footballers
Unión de Curtidores footballers
Atlético Reynosa footballers
Club Atlético Zacatepec players
Ascenso MX players
Liga Premier de México players
Tercera División de México players
Footballers from Guerrero
People from Acapulco
Association footballers not categorized by position